Kato Hideki (born 1962 in Nagoya, Japan; 加藤英樹, family name Kato) is a Japanese musician and composer. He was a seminal member of the Tokyo Noise music scene of the late 80s and early 90s, collaborating with Japanese experimental musicians such as Otomo Yoshihide, Tatsuya Yoshida, Makigami Koichi, and Yamatsuka Eye.  He led his own bands, Player Piano and Bass Army.  He was a member of the original Ground Zero with Otomo and Uemura Masahiro.  In 1992 Kato moved to New York City where he still resides.

Since relocating to New York, Kato has recorded and performed with  John Zorn, Marc Ribot,  Christian Marclay, Calvin Weston, Eyvind Kang, Billy Martin (percussionist), Nicolas Collins, Zeena Parkins, Charlie Burnham, Karen Mantler,  John King, Michael Schumacher, Chris Cochrane, Brian Chase and many others.

His collaborations include Dying Ground, Billy Martin's Socket, Phase III, Italian DOC Remix, and the Crescent Moon Trio.  He has an electronic duo with James Fei.

In 1995 he formed Death Ambient with Ikue Mori and Fred Frith and released three CDs on the Tzadik label, including "Drunken Forest," in 2007.

In 2004 he formed the trio Green Zone, with Otomo Yoshihide and Uemura Masahiro—the lineup of the original Ground Zero, but this time with Kato as leader.  The band name comes from the 10 km² area in central Baghdad during the US-Iraq war. The pieces Kato wrote for this trio were inspired by the US invasion of Iraq.

His latest project is a rock'n'roll band, Plastic Spoon, for which he wrote music and lyrics, in addition to playing bass.  Other members are Karen Mantler (vocals, harmonica), Doug Wieselman (guitar), and Shahzad Ismaily (drums).

Kato's music has become more political since he emigrated to the US. His recent works focus on pollution and global warming and income inequality. He describes his music as "documentary without pictures."

Recordings 

Karada wa Oto o Dasu Mono /Bass Army (Trigram) - Dual Bass trio with the original Ruins bassist & Ground Zero drummer
Hope & Despair (Extreme) - An acoustic CD with musicians in NYC and Japan
Death Ambient (Tzadik, 1995) - The first Death Ambient CD with Ikue Mori & Fred Frith
Sieves (Improvised Music from Japan, 1993) - Electro-Acoustic Duo with James Fei
Turbulent Zone (Music for Expanded Ears, 1998) - Solo Electric Bass CD, using Prime Number tuning
Synaesthesia (Tzadik, 1999) - The second Death Ambient CD
Green Zone (doubtmusic, 2005) - The trio with the original Ground Zero crew
Drunken Forest (Tzadik, 2007) - Third Death Ambient release, produced by Kato
Byat (Callithump, 2008) - Second Green Zone release, produced by Kato, mastered by Kato and James Fei

External links
Kato Hideki official site 

Japanese composers
Japanese male composers
Japanese male musicians
Living people
Musicians from Aichi Prefecture
1962 births
Peril (band) members